Thomas Wood (1792–1861) was the 14th mayor of Columbus, Ohio.  He was also the 13th person to serve in that office.   He was appointed by the City Council to serve the remainder of mayor John G. Miller's unfinished term.  He served Columbus for one year.  His successor after 1841 was Abram I. McDowell.

References

Bibliography

External links
Thomas Wood at Political Graveyard

Mayors of Columbus, Ohio
1792 births
1861 deaths
19th-century American politicians